Simcoe County is located in the central portion of Southern Ontario, Canada. The county is just north of the Greater Toronto Area, stretching from the shores of Lake Simcoe in the east to Georgian Bay in the west. Simcoe County forms part of the Greater Golden Horseshoe area, a densely populated and industrialized region, centred on the Greater Toronto Area.

The elevated Niagara Escarpment runs through sections of the western part of the county, and the Minesing Wetlands, a Ramsar Convention wetland of international importance, is located in the central area of the county.

The county administrative centre is on Highway 26 in Midhurst, outside Barrie.

Geography
Simcoe County is informally split into two subregions, “South Simcoe” and “North Simcoe”.  The dividing line between these two areas is Simcoe County Road 90 (Mill St.).

South Simcoe municipalities are situated at the northern boundary of the Greater Toronto Area (GTA) and therefore generally have a closer socio-economic association with the GTA.  South Simcoe is also within the Toronto commuter belt as it is home to a relatively high proportion of people commuting to the GTA.  South Simcoe is home to five municipalities, including: the Town of Innisfil, the Township of Adjala-Tosorontio, the Town of Bradford West Gwillimbury, the Township of Essa and the Town of New Tecumseth (which includes: Alliston, Beeton and Tottenham).

North Simcoe is less connected to the GTA due to its more removed geographic location, is generally less industrial than South Simcoe, and generally has a closer socio-economic association with the Muskoka area, located immediately north. However, North Simcoe hosts two GO Transit train stations that provide daily commuter rail service to Toronto.  North Simcoe includes the Township of Clearview, the Township of Oro-Medonte, the Township of Ramara, the Township of Severn, the Township of Springwater, the Township of Tay and the Township of Tiny, the Town of Collingwood, the Town of Midland, the Town of Penetanguishene and the Town of Wasaga Beach. The cities of Barrie and Orillia are geographically within North Simcoe, but both are politically independent single-tier municipalities.

History
Simcoe County, in particular the former Wendake area near Nottawasaga Bay, was the site of the earliest French exploration and settlement of Ontario; they were the first Europeans in the area. Several historic sites, including Carhagouha and Sainte-Marie among the Hurons, mark the earliest known contacts between the area's traditional Huron population and French missionaries. The Huron capital, Ossossané, was at one time the largest aboriginal settlement in all of North America outside Mexico.

The County, named by Lieutenant Governor of Upper Canada John Graves Simcoe in honour of his father Captain John Simcoe, was established as part of the Home District in 1798 by the Legislative Assembly of Upper Canada. Its initial territory was described as follows:

At its beginning, the County existed only for purposes of military enlistment. In 1823, it became a separate constituency for elections to the Legislative Assembly of Upper Canada, but, as eligibility to vote was dependent upon having title to property, and Simcoe's first registrar of deeds was not appointed until 1826, it did not send a separate member to the Assembly until the election of John Cawthra in 1828. It was withdrawn from the Home District in 1837, with its territory divided as follows:

Between 1837 and 1841 several acts were passed by the Legislature of Upper Canada which set apart Simcoe District. These acts named the townships that the County would encompass and authorized the levying of taxes for the purpose of constructing a jail and court house. On January 11, 1843, the jail and court house having been duly erected, the Governor General proclaimed the County of Simcoe to be a separate and distinct District. The province of Canada also appointed James R. Gowan as the first judge of the District of Simcoe.

The District was restructured in 1845, changing its composition to the following 24 townships:

 Adjala
 Artemesia
 Collingwood
 Essa
 Flos
 West Gwillimbury
 Innisfil
 Medonte
 Matchedash
 Mulmur
 Mono
 Nottawasaga
 Osprey
 Oro
 North Orillia
 South Orillia
 Saint Vincent
 Sunnidale
 Tay
 Tecumseth
 Tosorontio
 Tiny
 Uphrasia (sic)
 Vespra

Effective January 1, 1850, Simcoe District was abolished, and Simcoe County was organized for municipal purposes.

Between 1845 and 1851, there had been a campaign to have the part of West Gwillimbury south of the Holland River annexed to York County. The County Council finally agreed to this action in 1851, subject to arbitration as to the division of liabilities. It was implemented by an Act of the Parliament of the Province of Canada later that year.

On January 1, 1852, after transferring its five western townships to Grey County, the County was defined as including the following townships:

 Adjala
 Essa
 Flos
 Gwillimbury West
 Innisfil
 Matchedash
 Medonte
 Mono
 Mulmur
 Nottawasaga
 Orillia
 Oro
 Sunnidale
 Tay
 Tecumseth
 Tiny
 Tossorontio (sic)
 Vespra

Together with the unorganized territory bounded to the north by the French River, to the south by the Severn River and Rama Township, to the west by Lake Huron and to the east by the former boundary between the Home District and the Newcastle District as extended to the French River.

The unorganized territory, some of which had been surveyed into townships, together with parts of Victoria County and Nipissing District, was withdrawn in 1868-1869 to form the new District of Muskoka and District of Parry Sound. However, any municipalities established in them still formed part of the original counties for municipal purposes, and they were still responsible for the administration of justice, which proved to be problematic. The portions of the districts that were not part of Simcoe County were transferred to it in 1877. This lasted until 1888, when the territory contained within the districts was separated from Simcoe County.

Mono and Mulmur Townships were withdrawn from Simcoe County in 1881 and transferred to the newly formed Dufferin County.

Mara and Rama Townships were transferred to Simcoe County following the dissolution of Ontario County in 1974.

Restructuring (1994)

In 1994, the County was restructured into 16 local municipalities:

 Town of Bradford West Gwillimbury
 Town of Collingwood
 Town of Innisfil
 Town of Midland
 Town of New Tecumseth
 Town of Penetanguishene
 Town of Wasaga Beach
 Township of Adjala–Tosorontio
 Township of Clearview
 Township of Essa
 Township of Oro-Medonte
 Township of Ramara
 Township of Severn
 Township of Springwater
 Township of Tay
 Township of Tiny

The cities of Barrie and Orillia are separated from the County, as are three Indian reserves:

Christian Island 30
Christian Island 30A
Mnjikaning First Nation 32

Demographics

Government
The Corporation of the County of Simcoe comprises 16 local municipalities.  As an "upper tier" municipality, the County of Simcoe is responsible for municipal services which include social housing, land ambulance and emergency planning, environmental services (solid waste management), a County road system, Ontario Works, children's services, homes for the aged, a library co-operative, museum, archives, County forest management, tourism, a Geographic Information System (computer mapping) and land use policy planning.

The local, or "lower tier" municipalities are responsible for water and sewer services, local roads, public libraries, recreation services, fire and police services, land use development control and licensing and permitting services.

The cities of Barrie and Orillia, although separate politically and administratively from the County, are geographically and economically part of the County and send elected representatives to serve on County committees which provide services to the residents of the cities, including paramedic services, long term care facilities, social services, social housing, archives and Museum.  They are counted within the census division.

County Council is composed of the mayors and deputy mayors of each of the sixteen towns and townships which comprise the County of Simcoe.  The head of County Council is called the Warden and is elected for a one-year term by the council members at the Inaugural Meeting, held each December.

Though once a consideration according to the Wasaga Sun, Simcoe County has elected not to restructure itself as a regional municipality.

Federal and provincial representation
Simcoe County encompasses all or part of the federal electoral districts of Barrie—Springwater—Oro-Medonte, Barrie—Innisfil, York—Simcoe, Simcoe—Grey and Simcoe North.

The current Members of Parliament representing Simcoe County are:
 Bruce Stanton (Conservative), Simcoe North
 Terry Dowdall (Conservative), Simcoe—Grey
 Doug Shipley (Conservative), Barrie—Springwater—Oro-Medonte
 John Brassard (Conservative), Barrie—Innisfil
 Scot Davidson (Conservative), York—Simcoe

Simcoe County encompasses all or part of the provincial electoral districts of Barrie—Springwater—Oro-Medonte, Barrie—Innisfil, York—Simcoe, Simcoe—Grey and Simcoe North.

The current Members of Provincial Parliament representing Simcoe County are:
 Jill Dunlop (Progressive Conservative), Simcoe North
 Brian Saunderson (Progressive Conservative), Simcoe—Grey
 Doug Downey (Progressive Conservative), Barrie—Springwater—Oro-Medonte
 Andrea Khanjin (Progressive Conservative), Barrie—Innisfil
 Caroline Mulroney (Progressive Conservative), York—Simcoe

Local services

Law enforcement and policing
Six police services provide law enforcement and local policing in Simcoe County: Barrie Police Service in Barrie; South Simcoe Police Service in Innisfil and Bradford West Gwillimbury; Midland Police Service in Midland, Ontario; Rama Police Service in Rama, Ontario and for the Chippewas of Rama First Nation; Anishinabek Police Service on Christian Island and for the Beausoleil First Nation; and Ontario Provincial Police for the rest of the county including Orillia, and enforcement on provincial highways, especially Ontario Highway 400 and Ontario Highway 11.

Canadian Forces Military Police provides policing and security for Canadian Forces Base Borden (25 km southwest of Barrie).

Public health
The local public agency for the county, the cities of Barrie and Orillia, and the neighbouring District Municipality of Muskoka is the Simcoe Muskoka District Health Unit. It is responsible for delivering public health programs and services, enforcing public health regulations, and advising local officials and local governments on health issues.

Simcoe County has 5 hospitals: Royal Victoria Regional Health Centre in Barrie; Orillia Soldiers’ Memorial Hospital; Stevenson Memorial Hospital in Alliston, Ontario (New Tecumseth); Collingwood General And Marine Hospital; and Georgian Bay General Hospital in Midland and Penetanguishene. Southern parts of the County are also served by the Southlake Regional Health Centre in Newmarket, Ontario (York Region).

The County operates ambulance and paramedic services (EMS) for the county and the independent cities of Barrie and Orillia. The Beausoleil First Nation (Christian Island) and the Chippewas of Rama First Nation (Rama) operate their own EMS services for their territories.

Economy
The economy of Simcoe County is diverse and includes a full range of businesses from agricultural, industrial to high-tech.

Honda of Canada Manufacturing has been established in Simcoe County since 1986 and is one of the county's largest single employers.  In addition to the automotive industry, other industries include plastics, glass manufacturing, pharmaceuticals, and aggregate resources. The county is also home to other institutions including Casino Rama, Georgian College, Canadian Forces Base Borden, a campus of Lakehead University and the Ontario Provincial Police Headquarters.

Agri-business is a diverse, multi-faceted industry and farmland in the region is among the best in all of Canada, including a section of the Holland Marsh in Bradford.

Tourism is a vital industry in Simcoe County, providing a diversity of jobs and economic impact in a variety of sectors including accommodation, restaurants, destinations, events and retail. Simcoe County plays host to over eight million visitors annually that contributes more than 570 million dollars in spending to its economy.

Transportation

Road
The road network in Simcoe County is based on a grid pattern, with most roads running north–south or east–west. The topography of the land has permitted roads to be set in predominantly straight lines.

Simcoe County is traversed by many Provincial Highways; Ontario Highway 400 being the most significant. Other provincial highways in Simcoe County include: Highway 11, Highway 12, Highway 26, Highway 89 and Highway 93.

Simcoe County also maintains an extensive series of County Roads, see List of numbered roads in Simcoe County.

Rail
GO Transit operates daily commuter rail services to and from downtown Toronto along its Barrie line with three stops in Simcoe County: one stop in Bradford West Gwillimbury (Bradford) and two stops in Barrie (Barrie South and Allandale Waterfront).

Via Rail's Canadian Toronto-Vancouver transcontinental passenger train makes request stops at the Washago railway station in Severn.

There are three main rail freight operators in Simcoe County; Canadian National Railway (CN), Canadian Pacific Railway (CPR) and Barrie Collingwood Railway.

Air
Lake Simcoe Regional Airport is a registered airport located almost midway between Barrie and Orillia, in the township of Oro-Medonte. The airport is owned jointly by the City of Barrie (60%), the Township of Oro-Medonte (20%), and the County (20%). The airport is equipped to accommodate propeller and jet aircraft, and is classified as an airport of entry by Nav Canada and is staffed by the Canada Border Services Agency. The County is also served by the Orillia Ramara Regional Airport in Ramara, 12 km northeast of Orillia. The closest major airport, however, is Toronto Pearson International Airport.

Public transit

LINX

The County has operated an intercommunity regional bus service, LINX, since 2018. It also operates a subsidiary paratransit service called LINX+. The LINX system connects population centres in the area such as Barrie, Orillia, Midland, Penetanguishene, Wasaga Beach, and Collingwood, and acts as an intermediate transit layer between local community bus services and higher-order regional transit, such as GO Transit and Ontario Northland. Planned future routes would connect Alliston with Bradford West Gwillimbury, and Midland with Orillia.

Local transit

Some of the County's larger urban centres have local public transit operations, which consist of bus services. These include Barrie Transit, BWG Transit (Bradford West Gwillimbury), Colltrans (Collingwood), Orillia Transit, Midland Penetanguishene Transit, and Wasaga Beach Transit.

Intercity bus

Intercity bus services serving Simcoe County include GO Transit (Route 68), and Ontario Northland.

Education

 The Simcoe County District School Board operates all public schools within Simcoe County.
 The Simcoe Muskoka Catholic District School Board operates the separate Catholic school system within Simcoe County.
 The Conseil scolaire Viamonde operates all French language public schools within Simcoe County.
 The Conseil scolaire de district catholique Centre-Sud (CSDCCS) operates all French language Catholic schools within Simcoe County.

Undergraduate and graduate university programs are offered at Lakehead University in Orillia. Post-secondary education is also offered by Georgian College in Barrie, Midland, Orillia and Collingwood. A number of additional universities offer programs through the University Partnership Centre (UPC) in Georgian College.

See also
 List of municipalities in Ontario
List of townships in Ontario

Further reading

Notes

References

External links

 
Counties in Ontario